Andrés Vilaseca (born 8 May 1991) is a Uruguayan rugby union player. He was named in Uruguay's squad for the 2015 Rugby World Cup.

References

External links

1991 births
Living people
Austin Gilgronis players
Expatriate rugby union players in the United States
Uruguay international rugby union players
Uruguayan expatriate rugby union players
Uruguayan expatriate sportspeople in the United States
Place of birth missing (living people)
Peñarol Rugby players
Uruguayan rugby union players
Rugby union centres
Rugby union wings
People educated at The British Schools of Montevideo
Rugby Club Vannes players